The 1932 Copa del Presidente de la República Final was the 32nd final of the principal Spanish football cup competition, now known as the Copa del Rey. Athletic Bilbao beat FC Barcelona 1–0 and won their 12th title, the third in a row.

Road to the final

Match details

See also
Athletic–Barcelona clásico

References

linguasport.com
RSSSF.com

External links
MundoDeportivo.com 
Marca.com 
AS.com 

1932
Copa
FC Barcelona matches
Athletic Bilbao matches